Voice is the debut extended play by South Korean singer Onew. It was released on December 5, 2018, under SM Entertainment, five days before his 
military conscription. "Blue" served as the album's lead single.

Background and release
In November 2018, SM Entertainment announced that Onew would be enlisting in the Korean military as part of his required military duties. On November 22, the label announced that Onew would be the fourth Shinee member to make a solo debut, with plans to release the album ahead of his enlistment in early December.

The album's title was announced on November 28, along with its title track and release date. The full tracklist was revealed on December 3, with the music video teaser for "Blue" releasing the following day. The full album and music video were released on December 5.

Commercial reception
Voice peaked at number two on the Korean Gaon Album Chart, while in Japan it reached number 24 on the Oricon chart, selling 4,768 copies in its first week of release.

Track listing

Charts

References

SM Entertainment EPs
2018 debut EPs
Korean-language EPs
IRiver EPs
Onew EPs